La Chorrera is a town and municipality in the southern Colombian Department of Amazonas.  The population is largely engaged in agricultural production, hunting, fishing, and banana and cassava growing.  The municipality was once a notable site for rubber production, exploited by the Peruvian Julio César Arana brothers at the turn of the 20th century, north of the Putumayo River. The territory has an area of 12670 km².

References

External links 
 Government of Amazonas Department; La Chorrera

Municipalities of Amazonas Department